Church of the Annunciation is a historic Roman Catholic church at 105 Main Street in Shelbyville, Kentucky.  It was built in 1860 and added to the National Register of Historic Places in 1984.

It was built in 1860, after the first Roman Catholic priest came to Shelbyville in 1842.  It is a two-story brick Gothic Revival-style church built with stone sills and arches.  It has a three-story tower.

It was listed as part of a larger study of historic resources in Shelbyville.

References

Roman Catholic churches in Kentucky
National Register of Historic Places in Shelby County, Kentucky
Gothic Revival church buildings in Kentucky
Roman Catholic churches completed in 1860
19th-century Roman Catholic church buildings in the United States
Churches on the National Register of Historic Places in Kentucky
Churches in Shelbyville, Kentucky
1860 establishments in Kentucky